The Boston College Marching Band (BCMB), also known as the Boston College "Screaming Eagles" Marching Band, is the marching band for the Boston College Eagles.  Founded in 1919, The Band is the largest and most visible student organization at Boston College, and represents the school at home football games, most bowl games, international events, and parades.

Band
The Boston College Marching Band has about 180 members and is under the direction of David Healey. The Band consists of the following sections: high brass, low brass, woodwinds, battery, front ensemble and dance team. Professional section instructors and student leaders oversee and facilitate all rehearsals and performances.  While auditions are not required for instrumentalists, they are required for visual team members and the positions of assistant conductor as well as Drum Major.

While most members of the BCMB are students of Boston College, the Band also has a partner-school program, which incorporates a wide variety of students from Boston-based institutions.  Prominent schools include Berklee College of Music, Emerson College, Emmanuel College, Northeastern University, Simmons College, Suffolk University, Massachusetts Institute of Technology and Wentworth Institute of Technology.  All Boston area college students can join the Band.

The Band performs two different half-time shows a year in the drum and bugle corps style of marching. These halftime shows, which are approximately 6 minutes in length, typically consist of 30-40 sets. The Band also performs in the stands during the game, electrifying the fans with a wide repertoire of music.

Music and performances

The Band performs at all home football games, parades in the Boston area, and away games each season, with the exception of 2009 (see below). Regular season destinations have included the University of Maryland, Clemson University, and the University of Southern California.  Postseason travel has taken the Band to Jacksonville, Florida for the ACC Championship Game, Orlando, Florida for the Champs Sports Bowl, New York City for the Pinstripe Bowl, Shreveport, Louisiana for the Advocare v100 Bowl, Dublin, Ireland for the Emerald Isle Classic and Yokohama, Japan for the Yokohama Bowl.

In the 2010, 2011, and 2012 seasons, the Band traveled to Canada to perform a pre-game and halftime routine for the Montreal Alouettes. The Band has also had the opportunity to perform with the Boston Pops Orchestra at the annual Pops on the Heights concert.

Three hours before kickoff, the Boston College Marching Band parades through Lower Campus and leads the football team into Alumni Stadium. Afterward, The Band performs a short concert on the steps of Silvio O. Conte Forum.

Before the football game starts, the Marching Band performs "The Pre-Game Show."  Pre-Game starts with a High-Brass Fanfare, performed by the Trumpets and Mellophones.  The Band then prances out onto the field and performs a series of BC fight songs.  First, the Band performs "Sons of Maroon and Gold", and "All Up For Boston,".  The Band then salutes the opposing team by playing their fight song.  The Band then proudly performs the nation's oldest fight song "For Boston." During "For Boston," the Band forms the letters "BC" on the field, and during the final phrases, "italicizes" the letters to match the school's logo.

In the stands, the Band also plays a variety of music. After every first down, the Band plays a short, 4-bar fanfare similar to "Sweep Down the Field," another BC fight song. The Band also plays numerous cheers, such as "E-A-G-L-E-S," and "Booty Drop".  Some songs the Band played during the 2012–13 season were:
"Mars, Bringer of War" by Gustav Holst
"O Fortuna" by  Carl Orff
"Viva la Vida" by Coldplay
"Edge of Glory" by Lady GaGa
"What Makes You Beautiful" by One Direction
"Gangnam Style" by Psy
"Where Have You Been" by Rihanna
"Good Time" by Owl City and Carly Rae Jepsen
"Heaven" by DJ Sammy
"Don't Stop Believin'" by Journey
"Living on a Prayer" by Bon Jovi
"I'm Shipping Up to Boston" by The Dropkick Murphys
"The Final Countdown" by Europe
"Just a Friend" by Biz Markie
"Crazy Train" by Ozzy Osbourne

The Band also performs versions of Neil Diamond's "Sweet Caroline" and The Foundations' "Build Me Up Buttercup," both of which have become traditions at Boston College.

Current staff of the band include: Brian Shanbrun-Woodwinds, Tim Leonelli-Low Brass, Mark Soo-High Brass, Simon Mazzoli-Percussion, Sanjay Pamaar-Percussion Assistant, Andre Sonner-Front Ensemble, and Mary Taber-Dance Team.

Additionally, the Band has performed the national anthem at Fenway Park, and on June 16, 2009 the Band opened for Aerosmith and the Dropkick Murphys at the Comcast Center in Mansfield, Massachusetts. The Band also performed "I'm Shipping Up to Boston" live onstage with the Dropkick Murphys at the Bank of America Pavilion in Boston on September 21, 2012.

The Band was also selected to perform at the Second inauguration of Barack Obama  in Washington, DC on January 21, 2013.

References

 http://www.bc.edu/jointheband
 http://www.bc.edu/bands

External links
 

Boston College
Boston College Eagles
Atlantic Coast Conference marching bands
1919 establishments in Massachusetts
Musical groups established in 1919